Johnny Luk (born 1990) is a strategic consultant and opinion columnist for Al Jazeera English. Luk was born in Hong Kong in 1990,  and grew up in England, studying at Heronsgate Middle School and Bedford Modern School, he graduated from the University of Durham in Natural Sciences.
  
Luk was Head of Policy and Strategy for Adecco UK, a Senior Policy Adviser in the Brexit Department and worked in the Business, Trade and Digital Departments of the British Government.  Luk has also served as a judge for Microsoft Ventures and the London Mayor's low carbon scheme. He was Chief Executive Officer of the National Association of College and University Entrepreneurs for two years  and was a Conservative party parliamentary candidate for the Constituency of Hampstead and Kilburn in the 2019 General Election. and was briefly the Conservative Friends of the Chinese's co-director. Luk was formerly a blogger for Huff Post. He was a Governor of the University for the Creative Arts.

References

1991 births
Conservative Party (UK) parliamentary candidates
British male rowers
21st-century British businesspeople
People educated at Bedford Modern School
People associated with the University for the Creative Arts
Hong Kong emigrants to the United Kingdom
British chief executives
21st-century British politicians
British politicians of Chinese descent
Living people
Alumni of St Cuthbert's Society, Durham